
Gmina Opatówek is a rural gmina (administrative district) in Kalisz County, Greater Poland Voivodeship, in west-central Poland.

Neighbouring gminas
Gmina Opatówek is bordered by the city of Kalisz and by the gminas of Ceków-Kolonia, Godziesze Wielkie, Koźminek, Szczytniki and Żelazków.

Villages 
The gmina contains the following villages: Bogumiłów, Borów, Chełmce, Cienia Druga, Cienia Pierwsza, Cienia Trzecia, Cienia-Folwark, Dębe-Kolonia, Frankowizna, Janików, Józefów, Kobierno, Michałów Czwarty, Michałów Drugi, Michałów Pierwszy, Michałów Trzeci, Modła, Nędzerzew, Nowa Tłokinia, Porwity, Rajsko, Rożdżały, Sierzchów, Słoneczna, Szałe, Szulec, Tłokinia Kościelna, Tłokinia Mała, Tłokinia Wielka, Trojanów, Warszew, Zawady, Zduny and Zmyślanka.

Towns 
Opatówek

References
Polish official population figures 2006

External links
 Jadwiga Miluśka: Opatówek Commune 
 Official information page of Kalisz County 
 Official website of Gmina Opatowek 

Opatowek
Kalisz County